August Joseph Pechwell (1757–1811) was a German painter.

Life
Pechwell was born at Dresden in 1757. He was instructed by Flutin, and afterwards went to Rome, where he remained till 1781. He painted altarpieces and portraits. He was Inspector of the Royal Gallery at Dresden. He died in 1811.

References

Sources
Attribution:
 

1757 births
1811 deaths
18th-century German painters
18th-century German male artists
German male painters
19th-century German painters
Artists from Dresden
19th-century German male artists